William Robert Hague (April 9, 1885 in London, England – September 9, 1969 in Ottawa, Canada) was a Canadian amateur and professional ice hockey goaltender. He won the Stanley Cup with the Ottawa Hockey Club in 1905. He played in three other Stanley Cup challenges during his career.

Playing career
Hague first played senior hockey in the Ottawa City Hockey League for the Ottawa Emmetts. He joined the Ottawa Hockey Club during the Silver Seven era, in 1905, succeeding Dave Finnie. In 1906 he was replaced by Percy LeSueur and he joined the Ottawa Victorias for the 1906–07 season. He played for the Victorias in a Cup challenge against Montreal Wanderers in 1908 losing a two-game series.

Hague later played for the Galt Professionals of the OPHL. With Galt he played in a Stanley Cup challenge against the Ottawa HC losing 7–4 in 1911. He joined the Moncton Victorias with several other Galt players, winning the Maritime championship and played in another Stanley Cup challenge in 1912 against the Quebec Bulldogs, losing a two-game series. He later played for Halifax Socials and Montreal Wanderers of the NHA. He retired after the 1916–17 season.

References

Bibliography

Notes

External links
Billy Hague at JustSportsStats

1969 deaths
1885 births
Montreal Wanderers (NHA) players
Ottawa Senators (original) players
Stanley Cup champions
Canadian ice hockey goaltenders
British emigrants to Canada